The Best of Country Sing the Best of Disney is an album featuring country music artists singing Disney songs. It was released on September 10, 1996 by Walt Disney Records. The album peaked at number 17 on the Billboard Top Country Albums chart and number 107 on the all-genre Billboard 200. The song "Someday" is from The Hunchback of Notre Dame.

Track listing

Chart performance

See also
Country Sings Disney - A similar compilation of country music artists singing Disney songs released in 2008.

References

1996 compilation albums
Country albums by American artists
Compilation albums by American artists
Walt Disney Records compilation albums
Country music compilation albums
Covers albums